Bagh-e Zardalu (also Romanized as Bāgh-e Zardālū) is a village in Khabar Rural District, Dehaj District, Shahr-e Babak County, Kerman Province, Iran. At the 2006 census, its population was 98, in 21 families.

References 

Populated places in Shahr-e Babak County